Rajanikanta Bordoloi was a noted writer, journalist and tea planter from Assam, India.
 Some critics called him the Walter Scott of Assam.
He was President of the Asam Sahitya Sabha in 1925 which was held at Nagaon.

Works
Novels
 Miri Jiyori (1894)
 Manomoti(1900),
 Rahdoi Ligiri (1930),
 Nirmal Bhakat (1927),
 Tamreswar Mandir (1926)
 Rangilee (1925)
 Donduadrah (1909),
Radha aru Rukminir Ron(1925)
 Thamba-Thoibir Sadhu (1932)

He was a regular contributor to many leading magazines in that period such as Junaki, Banhi (magazine), Usha, Assam Hitoishi and Awahon. He also edited a monthly magazine called Pradipika.

See also
 Assamese literature
 History of Assamese literature
 List of Asam Sahitya Sabha presidents
 List of Assamese writers with their pen names

References

External links

Asom Sahitya Sabha Presidents
Novelists from Assam
1867 births
Writers from Guwahati
1940 deaths
20th-century Indian journalists
19th-century Indian journalists
19th-century Indian novelists
20th-century Indian novelists
Journalists from Assam